Edward "Poch" Juinio (born May 25, 1973) is a Filipino retired former professional basketball player of the Philippine Basketball Association. He played most of his seasons with Alaska Aces and won numerous championships.

Professional career

Alaska Milkmen 
A former 6'5" standout of the UP Fighting Maroons, Juinio was drafted by Alaska as the 5th overall pick in the 1994 PBA Draft. He turned out to be a revelation with his aggressive stance underneath the boards. He became an unheralded part of Alaska's starting unit when the team captured the PBA Grand Slam in 1996. He was awarded as the Most Improved Player of the Season and blossomed into one of the most dependable slotmen in the league.

He won Finals MVP in the 2000 All-Filipino Finals as Alaska won the championship in 5 games.

Pop Cola Panthers 
He was traded to Pop Cola, along with Johnny Abarrientos.

Coca-Cola Tigers 
When Pop Cola disbanded, Juinio joined the Tigers. In 2002, he won the All-Filipino Cup, against his former team. His team also won the Reinforced Conference in 2003.

Talk 'N Text Phone Pals 
After Juinio's contract expired in 2005, Talk 'N Text signed him. They released him the same year.

Return to Alaska franchise 
Juinio returned to Alaska in the 2006-07 PBA season and won another championship in 2007 PBA Fiesta Conference. He retired after the 2007-08 PBA season at the age of 36.

Coaching career 
Juinio is currently an assistant coach for the UP Maroons. He has been with the team since 2013.

National team 
Juinio donned the national colors in the 1993 Southeast Asian Games.

PBA career statistics 

|-
| style="text-align:left;"| 1994
| style="text-align:left;" rowspan="7"| Alaska
| 72 || 22.9 || .513 || .333 || .648 || 4.6 || .5 || .1 || .9 || 5.6
|-
| style="text-align:left;"| 1995
| 73 || 28.3 || .520 || .000 || .672 || 5.5 || .7 || .2 || 1.0 || 6.1
|-
| style="text-align:left;"| 1996
| 72 || 25.5 || .523 || .000 || .596 || 5.0 || 1.5 || .2 || 1.0 || 5.8
|-
| style="text-align:left;"| 1997
| 60 || 17.6 || .473 || .000 || .741 || 4.5 || 1.3 || .2 || .8 || 5.2
|-
| style="text-align:left;"| 1998
| 66 || 32.8 || .560 || .200 || .601 || 7.0 || 1.7 || .3 || 1.5 || 8.0
|-
| style="text-align:left;"| 1999
| 54 || 28.8 || .510 || .200 || .671 || 6.5 || 1.9 || .3 || .9 || 6.7
|-
| style="text-align:left;"| 2000
| 49 || 29.1 || .514 || .000 || .704 || 6.4 || .8 || .3 || 1.1 || 10.3
|-
| style="text-align:left;"| 2001
| style="text-align:left;"| Pop Cola
| 51 || 37.0 || .482 || .091 || .702 || 6.3 || 2.8 || .6 || .8 || 13.3
|-
| style="text-align:left;"| 2002
| style="text-align:left;" rowspan="3"| Coca-Cola
| 29 || 21.9 || .402 || .350 || .840 || 3.9 || 1.7 || .3 || .7 || 7.8
|-
| style="text-align:left;"| 2003
| 65 || 21.1 || .390 || .290 || .606 || 3.9 || 1.7 || .2 || .6 || 7.4
|-
| style="text-align:left;"| 2004-05
| 61 || 18.5 || .414 || .275 || .746 || 3.0 || 1.6 || .4 || .3 || 6.1
|-
| style="text-align:left;"| 2005-06
| style="text-align:left;"| Coca-Cola/ Talk 'N Text
| 29 || 8.9 || .327 || .417 || .571 || 2.4 || .4 || .1 || .2 || 1.6
|-
| style="text-align:left;"| 2006–07
| style="text-align:left;" rowspan="2"| Alaska
| 36 || 8.2 || .415 || .211 || .781 || 1.7 || .3 || .3 || .1 || 3.0
|-
| align=left | 

| 4 ||  4.3 || .333 || .000 || .000 || .5 || .3 || .0 || .0 || .5
|-class=sortbottom
| style="text-align:center;" colspan=2 | Career
| 721 || 24.5 || .480 || .286 || .747 || 4.8 ||	1.4 || .3 ||	.8 ||	6.8

References

1973 births
Living people
Alaska Aces (PBA) draft picks
Alaska Aces (PBA) players
Basketball players from Quezon City
Centers (basketball)
Filipino men's basketball players
Philippine Basketball Association All-Stars
Pop Cola Panthers players
Powerade Tigers players
Power forwards (basketball)
TNT Tropang Giga players
UP Fighting Maroons basketball players